(born 18 January 1969) is a Japanese former rugby union player who played as prop. He played 20 tests for the Japan national rugby union team including two matches in 1999 Rugby World Cup.
Currently he is the scrum coach for Canon Eagles.

Career
After his graduation from Doshisha University, Nakamura started to play for Suntory throughout all of his career, with which he won the All-Japan Rugby Football Championship in 1996.
He was first capped for Japan on 3 May 1998, against Canada, in Tokyo. He was also present at the 1999 Rugby World Cup, where he played two matches in the tournament. Nakamura's last cap for Japan was against Ireland, at Lansdowne Road, on 11 November 2000.

Notes

External links
Naoto Nakamura international stats
Naoto Nakamura profile at JRFU website
Naoto Nakamura Top League stats
Official Blog

1969 births
Japanese rugby union players
Japanese rugby union coaches
Rugby union props
Japan international rugby union players
Living people
People from Kyoto Prefecture
Sportspeople from Kyoto Prefecture
Asian Games medalists in rugby union
Rugby union players at the 1998 Asian Games
Asian Games silver medalists for Japan
Medalists at the 1998 Asian Games